Paul Merton in Europe is a six-part television series airing on Channel 5 from 11 January 2010 onwards. The series is a follow-up to Paul Merton in India. It follows presenter Paul Merton as he travels around several countries in Europe including Germany, Ireland, Italy, France and Spain. The series was released on DVD on 8 March 2010.

Episode list

References

External links

2010 British television series debuts
2010 British television series endings
Channel 5 (British TV channel) original programming
Television series by Banijay
Television series by Tiger Aspect Productions
British travel television series
Television episodes set in Germany
Television episodes set in Ireland
Television episodes set in Italy
Television episodes set in France
Television episodes set in Spain